The  is a submarine-launched attack floatplane designed for the Imperial Japanese Navy during World War II. It was intended to operate from I-400 class submarines whose original mission was to conduct aerial attacks against the United States.

Design and development
From the late 1920s, the Imperial Japanese Navy had developed a doctrine of operating floatplanes from submarines to search for targets.
In December 1941, Commander-in-Chief of the Japanese Combined Fleet, Admiral Isoroku Yamamoto, proposed constructing a large fleet of  submarine aircraft carriers (also designated STo or sen-toku — special submarine) whose purpose was to mount aerial attacks against American coastal cities. The submarines would surface to launch their aircraft by catapult, submerge to avoid detection, then surface again to retrieve the aircrews who would ditch their planes nearby.  By June 1942, the plan was to build a fleet of eighteen such submarines. This was later cut to nine, then five and finally just three as Japan's wartime fortunes declined.

Aichi was already manufacturing under license, the D4Y1 Suisei (Judy), a relatively small single-engined carrier dive bomber with exceptionally clean lines and high performance. Detailed engineering studies commenced in an effort to modify the Suisei for use aboard the I-400 submarines but the difficulties in doing so were eventually judged insurmountable and a completely new design was initiated.

Aichi's final design, designated AM-24 by Aichi and given the military designation M6A1, was a two-seat, low-winged monoplane powered by a  Aichi AE1P Atsuta 30 engine (a licence-built copy of the Daimler-Benz DB 601 liquid-cooled V12 engine). The original specification dispensed with a traditional undercarriage but it was later decided to fit the aircraft with detachable twin floats to increase its versatility. If conditions permitted, these would allow the aircraft to land next to the submarine, be recovered by crane and then re-used. The floats could be jettisoned in flight to increase performance or left off altogether for one-way missions.
The Seiran's wings rotated 90 degrees and folded hydraulically against the aircraft's fuselage (with the tail also folding down) to allow for storage within the submarine's  diameter cylindrical hangar. Armament was a single  torpedo or an equivalent weight in bombs. One  Type 2 machine gun was mounted on a flexible mounting for use by the observer.

As finalized, each I-400 class submarine had an enlarged watertight hangar capable of accommodating up to three M6A1s. The Seirans were to be launched from a  compressed-air catapult mounted on the forward deck. A well-trained crew of four men could roll a Seiran out of its hangar on a collapsible catapult carriage, attach the plane's pontoons and have it readied for flight in approximately 7 minutes.

In order to shorten the launching process and eliminate the need for time-consuming engine warm-ups, the Seirans were to be catapulted from a cold start. In this way, the aircraft's engine would be at or near normal operating temperature immediately upon getting airborne. The idea was borrowed from the Germans who planned on using a similar launch method for the aircraft of their unfinished carrier Graf Zeppelin.

The first of eight prototype Seirans was completed in October 1943, commencing flight testing in November that year. A problem with overbalance of the auxiliary wings was eventually solved by raising the height of the tail fin. Further testing was sufficiently successful for production to start in early 1944. In order to aid pilot conversion to the Seiran, two examples of a land based trainer version fitted with a retractable undercarriage were built. These were given the designation M6A1-K Nanzan ("Southern Mountain"). Besides the difference in landing gear, the vertical stabilizer's top portion, which was foldable on the Seiran, was removed.

Operational history
The first production examples of the Seiran were completed in October 1944. Deliveries were slowed by an earthquake near Nagoya on 7 December 1944, and by an American air-raid on 12 March 1945. Construction of the STo submarines was stopped in March 1945, after two submarine aircraft carriers had been completed and a third finished as a fuel tanker. These were supplemented by two smaller Type AM submarines, originally designed as command submarines carrying reconnaissance floatplanes, but capable of carrying two Seirans. Owing to the reduced carrier submarine force, production of the Seiran was halted, with a total of 28 completed (including the prototypes and the M6A1-Ks).

The new submarines and aircraft were assigned to the 1st Submarine Flotilla, comprising the two STo submarines, the I-400 and the flagship I-401, each carrying three Seirans together with two type AMs, the I-13 and I-14. The 1st Submarine Flotilla commenced training with the Seirans in January 1945, the crews gradually learning how to handle the submarines and aircraft.  Launching all three Seirans took longer than expected: 30 minutes if floats were fitted, although this could be reduced to 14.5 minutes if the floats were not used.

When the force was finally ready to set off on their mission against Panama,  Japan's increasingly desperate situation led to a change in plan, with the target for the attack, called Operation  Hikari (Splendour), being switched to the American base at Ulithi Atoll where forces, including aircraft carriers, were massing in preparation for attacks on the Japanese Home Islands. The flotilla departed Japan on 23 July 1945 and proceeded towards Ulithi. On 16 August, the flagship I-401 received a radio message from headquarters, informing them of Japan's surrender and ordering them to return to Japan. All six Seirans on board the two submarines, having been disguised for the operation as American planes in violation of the laws of war, were catapulted into the sea with their wings and stabilizers folded  (for the I-401) or pushed overboard (for the I-400) to prevent capture.

Variants

M6A1
Prototypes powered by Atsuta 30 or 31 1,044 kW (1,400 hp) engine and removable floats, 8 built.
M6A1 Seiran (Shisei-Seiran)
Special Attack Bomber, 18 built.
M6A1-K Nanzan (南山, "South Mountain")('Shisei-Seiran Kai)
Prototypes of training version, retractable wheeled landing gear, 2 built.
M6A2
Prototype modification, powered by Mitsubishi Kinsei MK8P 62 1,163 kW (1,560 hp) engine, 1 built

Operators

Imperial Japanese Navy Air Service
Naval Air Technical Arsenal / 1st Naval Technical Arsenal
631st Naval Air Group

Surviving aircraft
A single M6A1 has been preserved and resides in the Udvar-Hazy Center of the Smithsonian's National Air and Space Museum. It is located in the Washington, DC suburb of Chantilly, Virginia near Dulles International Airport. The Seiran was surrendered to an American occupation contingent by Lt Kazuo Akatsuka of the Imperial Japanese Navy, who ferried it from Fukuyama to Yokosuka. The US Navy donated it to the Smithsonian Institution in November 1962. Restoration work on the Seiran began in June 1989 and was completed in February 2000.

Specifications (M6A1)

See also

References
Notes

Bibliography
 Burke, Stephen. Without Wings The Story of Hitler's Aircraft Carrier. Trafford Publishing, 2008. .
Francillon, René J. Japanese Aircraft of the Pacific War. London: Putnam & Company Ltd., 1970.  (2nd edition 1979).
Geoghegan, John J. Operation Storm: Japan's Top Secret Submarines and Its Plan to Change the Course of World War II. Crown Publishers, NY, 2013. .
Januszewski, Tadeusz. Japanese Submarine Aircraft. Sandomierz, Poland/Redbourn, UK: Mushroom Model Publications, 2002. .
Layman, R.D. and Stephen McLaughlin. The Hybrid Warship. London:Conway Maritime Press, 1991. .
Mikesh, Robert C. Monogram Close-Up 13: Aichi M6A1 Seiran, Japan's Submarine-Launched Panama Canal Bomber. Bolyston, MA: Monogram Aviation Publications, 1975. .
"Nipponese Canal Cracker...Aichi's M6A1 Seiren". Air International, October 1989, Vol.37, No 4. Bromley, UK:Tri-Service Press. ISSN 0306-5634. pp. 182–188, 201.
Ogawa, Toshihiko. Nihon Kōkūki Daizukan, 1910–1945. Tokyo, 1993.

Sakaida, Henry; Gary Nila and Koji Takaki. I-400: Japan's Secret Aircraft-Carrying Strike Submarine''. Hikoki Publications, 2006.

External links

AirToAirCombat.com: Aichi M6A Seiran

M6A
M6A, Aichi
Floatplanes
Submarine-borne aircraft
Low-wing aircraft
World War II Japanese torpedo bombers
World War II Japanese dive bombers
Single-engined tractor aircraft